Bengel may refer to:

 Bengel (Mosel), a municipality in Rhineland-Palatinate, Germany
 Jakob Bengel, a chain and costume-jewelry factory in Idar-Oberstein, Rhineland-Palatinate, Germany
 Frank Bengel (born 1969), German professor and physician
 Johann Albrecht Bengel (1687–1752), Württemberger Lutheran clergyman and scholar

See also 
 Norma Bengell (1935–2013), Brazilian actress, singer, screenwriter and director
 Bengal (disambiguation)